Henk Duut (born 14 January 1964 in Rotterdam) is a retired Dutch footballer who played as a defender. Currently, he works as a coach at the Guangzhou Evergrande youth academy.

Playing career

Club
Duut started his football career at amateur side Transvalia ZW in his hometown Rotterdam before being scouted by Feyenoord. He made his professional debut on 13 March 1982 when Feyenoord won 1–2 in Eindhoven against PSV. For six seasons Duut was part of the Feyenoord squad and during the 1983–84 season he and his team mates won the double (Eredivisie and KNVB Cup). In December 1986, Feyenoord sent Duut on loan to Fortuna Sittard where he finished the season, after which Fortuna Sittard decided to sign Duut and he played another five years for the club based in Limburg.

International
Duut was a member of the Dutch team at the 1983 FIFA World Youth Championship.

Managerial career
On 29 April 1992, Duut was said to retire from professional football due to a cerebral hemorrhage. Earlier that year, on 7 February, he played his last match with Fortuna Sittard against MVV. Duut stayed at Fortuna Sittard and from the start of the following season (1992–93) he became a youth coach at the club, with which he stayed until 1996 to become Bert van Marwijk's assistant. Van Marwijk left Fortuna Sittard in 2000 to become the manager at Feyenoord and Duut took over as a manager. However, after 13 matches without a win he was taken out of his position. Again he became a youth coach at the club, until February 2002 when he joined the Japan-based Omiya Ardija as their manager for a season. He then became Pim Verbeek's assistant manager at the Netherlands Antilles national football team. In June 2004, he re-joined Feyenoord Rotterdam when the newly appointed manager, Ruud Gullit, asked him to become his assistant. After Gullit left, Duut remained in his position when his replacement Erwin Koeman arrived. On 11 December 2007, Duut was named as an assistant coach for the Australian national team, the Socceroos. He again worked under the newly appointed head coach, Verbeek.

On 8 April 2010, Duut followed Verbeek to Morocco to become coach of their Olympic squad. The team qualified for the Olympic Games in London 2012. He was dismissed in 2013 and left for China in 2016 to become coach of the U-19's at Guangzhou Evergrande.

Managerial statistics

References

External links
 Profile

1964 births
Living people
Footballers from Rotterdam
Association football defenders
Dutch footballers
Netherlands youth international footballers
Feyenoord players
Fortuna Sittard players
Eredivisie players
Dutch football managers
Omiya Ardija managers
Dutch expatriate football managers
Expatriate football managers in Japan
J2 League managers
Dutch expatriate sportspeople in Japan
Dutch expatriates in Australia
Dutch expatriate sportspeople in Morocco
Dutch expatriates in China